En Commun (English: In Common) is a French environmentalist political party created in 2020 by En Marche MPs Barbara Pompili, Hugues Renson and Jacques Maire.

The party is member of Ensemble Citoyens, which supports Emmanuel Macron in the 2022 French presidential election.

Representatives 
MPs in the 15th legislature of the French Fifth Republic.

References 

2020 establishments in France
Political parties established in 2020
Political parties of the French Fifth Republic
Green political parties in France